Taniplon is a nonbenzodiazepine anxiolytic drug from the imidazoquinazoline family of drugs.

Taniplon binds strongly to benzodiazepine sites on the GABAA receptor and has similar anxiolytic effects in animals, but with less sedative or muscle relaxant action.

References

Sedatives
Imidazoquinazolines
Oxadiazoles
GABAA receptor positive allosteric modulators